Hamid Ali Mazhar Shah (born 2 August 1992) is a Danish cricketer who made his debut for the Danish national side in July 2010. He is a right-handed all-rounder bowling off spin.

Career
Born in Brøndby, before making his senior debut for the national team, Shah played for Denmark at under-13, under-15, under-17, and under-19 level, as well as for Denmark A. His senior debut came in the 2010 European Cricket Championship Division One tournament in Jersey, with his highest score from three matches at the tournament being 37 from 81 balls against Scotland A. Against Norway in the final of the 2011 Nordic Cup, a 20-over tournament hosted by Denmark, Shah topscored with 40 runs out of a team total of 107. Earlier in the tournament, against Finland, he had been named man of the match after scoring 53 not out and taking 2/18. At the 2011 European T20 Championship, beginning shortly after the Nordic Cup, he played in all seven matches, having little batting success but taking seven wickets from his 12 overs bowled.

Shah had an outstanding 2012 season for Svanholm Kricketklub, his club side in the Danish Cricket League, and was named man of the match in four out of his fourteen matches. He finished fifth in the competition for runs scored (and second only to Zishan Shah for Svanholm), and was also his team's fourth-highest wicket taker (behind Sair Anjum, Bobby Chawla, and Henrik Hansen. Shah was consequently named in Denmark's squad for the 2012 World Cricket League Division Four tournament in Malaysia. He played only four matches there, but was Denmark's best bowler against both Nepal and Malaysia, with figures of 2/35 and 3/41, respectively. Shah switched clubs for the 2013 domestic season, playing for Kjøbenhavns Boldklub instead of Svanholm. At the 2013 European T20 Championship, he took 10 wickets from seven games, with a best of 4/25 against France.

Denmark placed second to Italy at the European T20 Championship, and subsequently qualified for the 2013 World Twenty20 Qualifier in the United Arab Emirates. Matches at the tournament had full Twenty20 status, and Shah made his Twenty20 debut in the opening match against Nepal. He topscored in that game with 18 from a team total of 79, and was also Denmark's leading rungetter against Bermuda, where he made 31 from 30 balls. His only wickets of the tournament came against the United States in the 15th-place playoff, where he took 3/20 from his four overs. At Denmark's next major tournament after the World Twenty20 Qualifier, the 2014 WCL Division Four tournament in Singapore, Shah took only a single wicket, in the third-place playoff against Italy. However, he was still named player of the match, after an innings of 52 in a 92-run opening stand with Zameer Khan. His sole wicket had been that of Michael Raso, which ended a 97-run partnership for the fifth wicket with Alessandro Bonora.

In March 2018, he was named as the captain of Denmark's squad for the 2018 ICC World Cricket League Division Four tournament in Malaysia. In September 2018, he was again named captain of Denmark's squad, this time for the 2018 ICC World Cricket League Division Three tournament in Oman. He was the leading run-scorer in the tournament, with 241 runs in five matches.

In May 2019, he was named in Denmark's squad for a five-match series against Leinster Lightning in Ireland, in preparation for the Regional Finals of the 2018–19 ICC T20 World Cup Europe Qualifier tournament in Guernsey. The same month, he was named as captain of Denmark's squad for the Regional Finals qualification tournament. He made his Twenty20 International (T20I) debut for Denmark, against Jersey, on 16 June 2019.

In August 2019, he was named as the captain of Denmark's squad for the 2019 Malaysia Cricket World Cup Challenge League A tournament. He made his List A debut for Denmark, against Malaysia, in the Cricket World Cup Challenge League A tournament on 16 September 2019. He finished the tournament as the leading run-scorer for Denmark, with 191 runs in five matches.

References

External links

1992 births
Living people
Danish cricketers
Danish cricket captains
Denmark Twenty20 International cricketers
People from Brøndby Municipality
Sportspeople from the Capital Region of Denmark